Ruffin is a name.


Family name 
Amber Ruffin, comedian and writer
Bruce Ruffin, American baseball pitcher
Bruce Ruffin, reggae singer
Chance Ruffin, American baseball pitcher
David Ruffin (1941–1991), American singer, one of the lead singers with The Temptations
Edmund Ruffin (1794–1865), American agricultural writer and Confederate firebrand
François Amable Ruffin, French general
François Ruffin, French journalist, activist, and politician
George Lewis Ruffin, first African-American graduate of Harvard University
Jimmy Ruffin (1936–2014), American singer
Joe Ruffin, victim in the Jenkins County, Georgia, riot of 1919
Josephine Ruffin, American civil rights leader
Michael Ruffin, American basketball player
Oxblood Ruffin, Canadian hacker, member of Cult of the Dead Cow and Hacktivismo
Phil Ruffin, American businessman
Saint Ruffin, a legendary Anglo-Saxon saint 
Thomas Ruffin (1787–1870), American jurist, Chief Justice of North Carolina Supreme Court

Given name 
Harrison Ruffin Tyler (born 1928), American chemical engineer, businessperson, and preservationist
Ruffin McNeill - current defensive coordinator for the Oklahoma Sooners football team

See also
 Rufin

Lists of people by surname